Unbridled is a 2018 Spanish-Italian thriller film directed by  in his feature film debut which stars Natalia de Molina alongside Daniel Grao. It is a sort of transfer of Henrik Ibsen's A Doll's House to a contemporary Andalusian setting.

Plot 
Set in Andalusia, the plot concerns about the arrival to regional power of Abel, a fresh face with a modest background, helming the up-and-coming political party Pueblo Unido. Against the backdrop of Abel's imminent investiture, a loan taken out in the past by Abel's wife Nora to help her husband without consulting with him, comes to haunt her whilst a person from their past, Víctor (the privileged son of a corrupt former Junta de Andalucía high-ranking official and former acquaintance of the couple) comes into action.

Cast

Production 
A Spanish-Italian co-production, the film was produced by La Canica Films and Animales sin collar AIE alongside Palomar SpA, with the participation of Netflix, RTVE, Movistar+ and Film Factory. It also had support from ICAA and collaboration with CreaSGR. Shooting locations included Seville and Carmona.

Release 
Distributed by eOne Films Spain, the film was theatrically released in Spain on 19 October 2018.

Reception 
Sergio F. Pinilla of Cinemanía rated the film 3 out of 5 stars, deeming it to display "character, an opportune cast and a few too many lines of dialogue".

Federico Marín Bellón of ABC rated the film 4 out of 5 stars, considering that "the sex and violence, not at all explicit, add forcefulness to the good decisions of the director and screenwriter".

Beatriz Martínez of Fotogramas rated the film 3 out of 5 stars highlighting the performances, particularly the ones of Natalia de Molina and Ignacio Mateos, while negatively assessing the film's lack of "forcefulness".

Accolades 

|-
| align  = "center" rowspan = "2" | 2019 || 6th Feroz Awards || Best Supporting Actor || Ignacio Mateos ||  || 
|-
| 28th Actors and Actresses Union Awards || Best New Actor || Borja Luna ||  || 
|}

See also 
 List of Spanish films of 2018

References 

2018 thriller films
Films set in Andalusia
Films shot in the province of Seville
Spanish political thriller films
Italian thriller films
2010s Spanish-language films
Films based on A Doll's House
2010s Spanish films
2010s Italian films